Hloubětín is a Prague Metro station on Line B, located in the eponymous district. It was opened on 15 October 1999 as an addition to the previously opened section of Line B.

History
This station was once a ghost station from 1998 to 1999. The station were in a state of suspended construction as the heavy industry factories it should have served were closed after the Velvet Revolution. Trains slowed when passing through the dimly lit station. As the whole industrial area was slowly revitalized, the station was finally completed.

References

External links

 Gallery 

Prague Metro stations
Railway stations opened in 1999
1999 establishments in the Czech Republic
Railway stations in the Czech Republic opened in the 20th century